The William Blake Archive is a digital humanities project started in 1994, a first version of the website was launched in 1996. The project is sponsored by the Library of Congress and supported by the University of North Carolina at Chapel Hill and the University of Rochester. Inspired by the Rossetti Archive, the archive provides digital reproductions of the various works of William Blake, a prominent Romantic-period poet, artist, and engraver, alongside annotation, commentary and scholarly materials related to Blake.

When publishing his poetry, William Blake would create print block illustrations for his book, print his books in black and white and then hand paint the illustrations within the prints. Furthermore, many of his works underwent multiple editions of printing, each with unique variations in the prints used to illustrate the poems and the poems themselves. Because of this complex process and the quality of his art, his art and poetry has been highly sought by collectors and scholars. The archive, as a digital humanities project, provides high quality digital copies of the facsimiles, providing scholars and students an opportunity to see the complexity of his published works often not available by viewing the scholarly print editions.

The archive has been peer reviewed by the Modern Language Association in 2005 and the Multimedia Educational Tools for Learning and Online Teaching (MERLOT) process in 2010. MERLOT highly recommended the use of the tool for teaching, praising the access to primary sources it provides; however, they also noted the need for educators to create instructional materials on how to use the site and the ease by which someone could get lost. Scholars have also written a number of educational case studies on how to use the archive.

Notes

References

Further reading
Whitson, Roger and Jason Whittaker. William Blake and Digital Humanities:Collaboration, Participation, and Social Media. New York: Routledge, 2013. .

External links
The William Blake Archive Homepage

Digital humanities
William Blake
American digital libraries
Digital humanities projects